The U.S. Virgin Islands Billie Jean King Cup team represents the United States Virgin Islands in Billie Jean King Cup tennis competition and are governed by the Virgin Islands Tennis Association. They currently compete in the Americas Zone of Group II.

History
The U.S. Virgin Islands competed in its first Billie Jean King Cup in 2022. Their best result was finishing fourth in their Group II pool in 2022.

Players

Recent performances
Here is the list of all match-ups of the U.S. Virgin Islands participation in the Billie Jean King Cup in 2022.

See also
Billie Jean King Cup
U.S. Virgin Islands Davis Cup team

References

External links

Billie Jean King Cup teams
Billie Jean King Cup
Billie Jean King Cup